Dúo Rey-Silva was a Chilean musical duo consisting of Alberto Rey (1915-1991) and Sergio Silva (1917-2017). Both sang while Rey played the harp and Silva the guitar. They performed principally in the cueca and tonada traditions. They also performed in Chilean motion pictures from the 1940 to the 1960s. Rey was also known for his work as a soloist on the harp. In 1996, they were honored with the designation as fundamental figures of Chilean music.

Discography
 América Canta ‎- RCA Victor, CML-2011, 1959
 Asi Se Canta En Mi Tierra - RCA Victor, CML-2094, 1959
 Cuecas  - RCA Victor, CML-2192, 1963		
 Los Grandes De La Cueca, RCA Victor, 1965
  Cuecas Con Mostaza, RCA Victor, 1966
 Cuecas con Ají, RCA Victor, 1966
 ¡Cuecas Pa' Morir Bailando!, RCA Victor, CML-2401, 1966
 Puras Cuecas, RCA Victor, CML-2605-X, 1968
 El Estilo Tradicional del Dúo Rey, RCA Victor, CML-2769-X, 1969		
 Las Cuecas De Siempre, RCA Victor, CML-2743-X, 1969
 Cuecas Bravas, RCA Victor, CML-2816-X, 1970		
 ¡Esta es Cueca Compañero!, RCA Victor, CML-2890-X, 1971		
 Internacional, RCA Victor, XXPL1-017, 1974

References

Chilean musicians